Imad Feghaly is a Lebanese actor and voice actor.

Filmography

Film 
Bil Kanoun. 2014
Al Mashhad Al Akhir. 2005

Television 

Khtarab El Hay - Fadi. 2014
Game of the Death. 2013
The Victors 2. 2012
Stability and Plant. 2009
Sarah. 2009

Dubbing roles 
 1001 Nights
 The Amazing World of Gumball - Rocky Robinson (second voice), Mr. Steve Small (third voice)
 Baby Looney Tunes - Baby Daffy (Lebanese dub)
 Batman: The Animated Series (Lebanese dub)
 Camp Lazlo - Lazlo
 Codename: Kids Next Door (Lebanese dubbing)
 Dexter's Laboratory - Valhallen (Image Production House version)
 Digimon Fusion - Mikey Kudo
 Firebreather
 Foster's Home for Imaginary Friends - Bloo
 Kim Possible - Erik
 Mokhtarnameh - Mondher
 Prophet Joseph
 Puppy in My Pocket: Adventures in Pocketville
 Rated A for Awesome - Lester Awesome
 Rekkit Rabbit - Yoshimi
 Tom and Jerry Tales - Tom Cat
 Uncle Grandpa
 Wabbit - Cal
 Yu-Gi-Oh! GX - Jaden Yuki
 Pokémon Journeys - Leon, Gary Oak

References

External links 

Lebanese male actors
Lebanese male voice actors
Living people
Place of birth missing (living people)
Year of birth missing (living people)